Ricardo Salampessy (born 18 February 1984) is an Indonesian professional footballer who plays as a defender for Liga 2 club Persipura Jayapura.

International career
Born in Ambon, Maluku, he has played for the Indonesia national football team. His international début in senior national team squad was at the 2006 Merdeka Tournament when Indonesia drew 1–1 with Malaysia on 23 August 2006.  In the Asian Cup 2007 he played 3 times from 3 matches when Indonesia won 2–1 against Bahrain, when Indonesia lost 1–2 against Saudi Arabia, and when Indonesia lost 0–1 to South Korea in group D at Jakarta. In 2004, he participated for the Papua football team at PON in South Sumatra. In 2007, he played to represent the Indonesia U-23, in 2007 SEA Games.

International goals 

|}

Honours

Club 
Persipura Jayapura
 Indonesia Super League: 2008–09, 2010–11, 2013
 Indonesian Community Shield: 2009
 Indonesian Inter Island Cup: 2011
 Indonesia Soccer Championship A: 2016

Individual 
 First Division Best Player: 2005
 Liga 1 Team of the Season: 2019

References

External links
 
 

1984 births
Living people
Indonesian Christians
Indonesian footballers
Indonesia international footballers
2007 AFC Asian Cup players
Indonesian Premier Division players
Liga 1 (Indonesia) players
Indonesian Super League-winning players
Persiwa Wamena players
Persipura Jayapura players
People from Ambon, Maluku
Sportspeople from Maluku (province)
Association football defenders